The Havana is a breed of rabbit that first appeared in the Netherlands in 1898. The breed is ancestral to several others, including the Fee de Marbourg, Perlefee and Gris Perle de Hal. Havanas are recognized by the American Rabbit Breeders Association in five color types: chocolate, lilac, black, blue, and broken.

Scientific Information

The Havana Rabbit belongs to:
Domain: Eukarya-
Kingdom: Animalia-
Phylum: Mammalia-
Class: Mammalia-
Order: Lagomorpha-
Family: Leporidae-
Genus: Oryctolagus-
Species: Oryctolagus Cuniculus-

See also

List of rabbit breeds

References

External links
Havana Rabbit Breed History
Breeds of Rabbits
 

Rabbits as pets
Rabbit breeds
Rabbit breeds originating in the Netherlands